Mama Municipality (In the Yucatec Maya Language: “maternal water") is one of the 106 municipalities in the Mexican state of Yucatán containing (117.52 km2) of land and is located roughly 55 km southeast of the city of Mérida.

History
There is no accurate data on when the town was founded, though it existed before the conquest as part of the chiefdom of Tutulxiu. At colonization, Mama became part of the encomienda system with the encomendero of Juan Aguilar, in 1580.

Yucatán declared its independence from the Spanish Crown in 1821, and in 1825 the area was assigned to the low sierra partition and designated as its own municipality.

Governance
The municipal president is elected for a three-year term. The town council has four councilpersons, who serve as Secretary and councilors of public works; education, culture and sports; public sanitation and potable water; and public lighting.

The Municipal Council administers the business of the municipality. It is responsible for budgeting and expenditures and producing all required reports for all branches of the municipal administration. Annually it determines educational standards for schools.

The Police Commissioners ensure public order and safety. They are tasked with enforcing regulations, distributing materials and administering rulings of general compliance issued by the council.

Communities
The head of the municipality is Mama, Yucatán.  The populated areas of the municipality include: Chaltubalam, Limonar, Moam, Pisté, Saca, Sacalum, Sacalumchen, San Agustín, San Andrés, San Bernardino, San Francisco, San Juan, San Mateo Dos, San Salvador, Santa Catalina, Santa Cruz, Santa María, Simkilá, Tikinmul, Took and Xtecab. The significant populations are shown below:

Local festivals
Every year from 4 to 15 August a festival in honor of the Virgin of the Assumption is held.

Tourist attractions
 Church of the Assumption

References

Municipalities of Yucatán